The 2017 Trail World Championships was the 7th edition of the global trail running competition, Trail World Championships, organised by the International Association of Ultrarunners (IAU) and was held in Badia Prataglia (Italy), the 10 June 2017.

Results

Men

Women

References

External links
 Official web site of IAU (governing body for ultra running)
 Official web site of ITRA (governing body for trail running)

IAU Trail World Championships
2017 in Italian sport
Province of Arezzo
Trail World Championships
Sport in Tuscany